Michael Lehning (born 1967) is a German and Swiss environmental and atmospheric scientist. He is a professor of environmental engineering at EPFL (École Polytechnique Fédérale de Lausanne), the head of EPFL's Laboratory of Cryospheric Sciences, and head of the group Snow Processes at the Swiss Federal Institute for Forest, Snow and Landscape Research (WSL).

Career 
Lehning received a Diploma in geo-ecology from the University of Bayreuth and a Master's degree in atmospheric sciences at University of California, Davis both in 1993. He pursued post-graduate studies in statistics and a PhD in atmospheric physics and graduated in 1996 from ETH Zürich with a thesis on "Transport processes and regional pollutant budgets over topography of varying complexity" supervised by Albert Waldvogel.

In 1997, he became a scientific collaborator at the Institute for Snow and Avalanche Research (SLF) of the WSL located in Davos, Switzerland. In 2001 he became head of the research and development team on Process Models, and from 2006 to 2018 he was head of the research unit on Snow and Permafrost.

Since 2011 he has been a full professor at the EPFL and the head of the Laboratory of Cryospheric Sciences at EPFL's School of Architecture, Civil and Environmental Engineering. Since 2018 he also been head of the group Snow Processes at SLF. Since 2021, he is co-director of the UNIL-EPFL center for climate action CLIMACT.

Research 
Lehning's research is focussed on snow processes and snow atmosphere interactions. This includes advancing the understanding of fluid dynamics of drifting and blowing snow, and generating advanced snow models, which can be used to assess and predict changes in surface mass balance of our snow and ice surfaces. In this context, he coined the term Preferential Deposition to describe the process that leads to uneven precipitation distribution in mountains. This allows for a improved assessment of avalanche danger, estimating the future of snow, hydropower and stream temperatures, and finding management practices in ski areas.

Using the knowledge on wind and radiation processes, Lehning has more recently contributed to investigating the potential of renewable energy installations in mountains to visualise how the Swiss energy turn around could be achieved.

He is the founder of spin-off companies such as APLsolut and SUNWELL.

Distinctions 
In 2020, Lehning won the new research programme Swiss Energy Research for the Energy Transition (SWEET) awarded Swiss Federal Office of Energy (SFOE) that aims at the de-centralised energy supply in the Swiss energy system. The grant totals a budget of CHF 21 million, involves 15 research and more than 40 implementation partners, and runs over 6 years. In 2001, Lehning received the Award for extraordinary performance in transfer of scientific knowledge to users from the Swiss Federal Institute for Forest, Snow and Landscape Research.

Selected works 
 <

References

External links 
 
 Website of the Laboratory of Cryospheric Sciences

1967 births
Living people
University of Bayreuth alumni
University of California, Davis alumni
ETH Zurich alumni
Academic staff of the École Polytechnique Fédérale de Lausanne
21st-century German geologists